Shabankareh Rural District is in Shabankareh District of Dashtestan County, Bushehr province, Iran. At the census of 2006, its population was 12,391 in 2,518 households; there were 12,369 inhabitants in 3,064 households at the following census of 2011; and in the most recent census of 2016, the population of the rural district was 14,448 in 4,041 households. The largest of its 31 villages was Khalifehi, with 1,976 people.

References 

Rural Districts of Bushehr Province
Populated places in Dashtestan County